Curtis Fentress   (born 1947) is an American architect. He is currently the principal-in-charge of design at Fentress Architects, an international design studio he founded in Denver, Colorado in 1980.

Fentress' work on Denver International Airport, Incheon International Airport and his modernization of Los Angeles International Airport have garnered recognition for design excellence and outstanding "airside-to-curbside" traveler experience. Focused on the public process, Fentress' works are in the genres of airport, museum and public buildings. A protégé of I.M. Pei, Fentress has developed a reputation as a hybrid architect, developing iconic design reflective of the region's culture, within the cost and budgetary confines associated with high-profile public architecture. He is known among students of architecture for his observations on the process of large-scale design.

Early history and education
Curt Fentress was born "between two wide spots in the road – Summerfield and Oak Ridge, North Carolina" to a poor sharecropping family on a tobacco farm. His neighborhood home was a sturdy two room log cabin with "outside accommodations".

Fentress earliest memories are of playing in a sandbox in the shade of a large umbrella tree. "I was an easy kid to watch. My grandmother was always hovering by that sandbox, and I just built incessantly." Fentress found his calling in high school where he gravitated to drafting courses. "I just ate up anything related to building – the teacher didn't know what to do with me," remembers Fentress, "I was through with the year's drafting projects in two months – it gave me a clue as to what I was going to do."

In college, Fentress secured a summer job as a draftsman, but constantly lobbied to be allowed into the architectural division. Finally, he was given his first design project:  site adaptations for 23 Krispy Kreme locations.  Curt Fentress graduated with honors in 1972 from North Carolina State University's College of Design, School of Architecture where he received a bachelor's degree of architecture.

Career

After graduation, Fentress interviewed at the offices of I.M. Pei in New York City and won the job. "I went to work the next morning, Thursday, and put in 70 hours by Monday morning", Fentress remembers. It was at Pei's office where Fentress first became fascinated with large scale public projects; "Many buildings at that time wound up being impersonal 50's modernist boxes. I took it upon myself to make these buildings more humanistic."

Fentress went on to another New York based firm, KPF (Kohn Pedersen Fox) Architects, continuing his interest in large scale public and private buildings.

Fentress then moved to Denver, Colorado as the KPF's Project Designer for the Rocky Mountain Headquarters of Amoco in downtown Denver. Attracted by the natural beauty of the area, Fentress struck out on his own, selecting Denver as the base for his new firm, C.W. Fentress and Associates with James Henry Bradburn. In 2004, Bradburn retired and in 2007 the firm's name was abbreviated from Fentress Bradburn Architects to Fentress Architects. Today, the firm maintains studios in Denver, Colorado, Los Angeles, California, Washington, D.C. and San Jose, California.

Fentress Architects became internationally recognized after designing the iconic DIA (Denver International Airport), known not only for its unique white canvas peaked roof, suggesting the snow-capped Rocky Mountains, also for its streamlined "curbside to airside" design and position as one of the "greenest" airports in the world. Fentress took a revolutionary approach to DIA by "flipping the building upside down" to create the largest canvas roof on any structure at that time – this has since become a much-imitated architectural technique.

DIA was voted the "Best Airport in North America" for four consecutive years and the fourth "Favourite American Architecture" landmark completed in the last fifteen years, ahead of the Getty Centre, TransAmerica Building and the Guggenheim Museum.

Fentress also designed Incheon International Airport in Seoul, South Korea, which was voted the World's Best Airport by Skytrax's 2009 World Airport Awards, a survey of 8.6 million international travellers.

In May 2008, the City of Los Angeles selected Fentress Architects to modernize Los Angeles International Airport (LAX), the fifth busiest airport in the world.

Fentress was inducted into the Denver Tourism Hall of Fame in 2009. The Tourism Hall of Fame serves as the highest award for Denver's travel industry. Fentress designed three of the most important landmarks in Denver, transforming the skyline.

Fentress designed the Colorado Convention Centre, winner of 18 design awards. Sports Authority Field at Mile High is the home of the Denver Broncos. Fentress is also the architect for the new Colorado Judicial Centre adjacent to the State Capitol.

Fentress is internationally recognized for his innovative design portfolio, which included $26 billion of architectural projects worldwide. Designs by Fentress have been featured in more than 1,200 national and international articles and books and have been honoured with more than 400 awards and accolades for design excellence and innovation.

In 2010, Fentress was given the Thomas Jefferson Award by the American Institute of Architects. The Jefferson Award recognizes Fentress for "a portfolio of accomplishments that evidences great depth while making a significant contribution to the quality of public architecture."

Curtis Fentress was inducted into the Colorado Business Hall of Fame by Junior Achievement-Rocky Mountain and the Denver Metro Chamber of Commerce in 2017.

Works

Airports
       Los Angeles International Airport Tom Bradley International Terminal, Los Angeles, California, USA
Denver International Airport Main Passenger Terminal, Denver, Colorado, USA
	Incheon International Airport Passenger Terminal, Seoul, Korea
	Seattle-Tacoma International Airport Central Terminal Expansion Seattle, Washington, USA

Government Buildings
	California Department of Education Headquarters, Sacramento, California, USA
	City of Oakland Administration Buildings, Oakland, California, USA
	Clark County Government Centre, Las Vegas, Nevada, USA
	Sacramento City Hall, Sacramento, California, USA

Office Buildings
One South Church, Tucson, Arizona, USA. Original designs called for a pair of twin towers; one tower was completed in 1986, while construction on the remainder has been on hold indefinitely. 
	1999 Broadway, Denver, Colorado, USA

Museums
	National Cowboy and Western Heritage Museum Expansion and Renovation, Oklahoma City, Oklahoma, USA
	National Museum of the Marine Corps, Quantico, Virginia, USA
	National Museum of Wildlife Art, Jackson, Wyoming, USA

Venues
	Colorado Convention Centre and Phase II Expansion, Denver, Colorado, USA
	Eccles Conference Centre and Peery's Egyptian Theatre, Ogden, Utah, USA
	INVESCO Field at Mile High, Denver, Colorado, USA
	Palm Springs Convention Centre Expansion, Palm Springs, California, USA

Sustainability
Fentress Architects has been recognized as a pioneer in sustainable design since the early 1990s.  The firm's green practices were acknowledged first in 1993 with the Architecture and Energy Award for the Natural Resources Building in Olympia, Washington.  It was the first project to ever set indoor air quality improvement as a goal at the onset of design, which established a standard for the industry.  Fentress also designed DIA (Denver International Airport), one of the largest daylit facilities ever built.  The firm's sustainable design for the California Department of Education Headquarters Building – Block 225 - created the largest LEED 2.0 GOLD rated building in the world, which became the second project in the world to achieve LEED EB Platinum in 2006.  The majority of the firm's licensed architects are LEED accredited professionals.  Fentress recently ranked among the Top 25 Green Design Firms by Engineering News-Record magazine, a leading publication in the design and construction industry.

 More than 60% of Fentress' projects under construction or completed in 2009 were LEED certified or pending certification.
 2003 LEED Gold 2.0 award for California's Department of Education Headquarters Building, which received Platinum certification in 2006 by the U.S. Green Building Council's Leadership in Energy and Environmental Design (LEED) rating system. It was featured as a case study in the Fall 2009 issue of High Performing Buildings.

See also
 Fentress Architects

References

Further reading
 The Master Architect Series III, Fentress Bradburn Selected and Current Works (Australia, The Images Publishing Group Pty Ltd., 1998)
 Curtis Worth Fentress (Milano, Italy: L'Arca Edizioni spa, 1996)
 Fentress Bradburn Architects (Washington, D.C.: Studio Press, 1996)
 Gateway to the West (Australia, The Images Publishing Group Pty Ltd., 2000)
 Millennium, Fentress Bradburn Selected and Current Works, Images Publishing, 2001
 Architecture in the Public Interest, Edizioni, 2001
 Civic Builders, Wiley-Academy, Great Britain, 2002.
 National Museum of the Marine Corps, North Carolina State University College of Design Publication, 2006
 10 Airports — Fentress Bradburn Architects, Edizioni Press, 2006.
 Portal to the Corps, Images Publishing, 2008
 Closed Mondays, Elizabeth Gill Lui, Nazraeli Press, 2005
 Touchstones of Design [re]defining Public Architecture, Images Publishing, 2010
 Public Architecture: The Art Inside, Oro Publishing, 2010

Newspaper/magazine article
 "Civic Minded Centres," Facility Manager, August/September 2006
 "The Seoul Experience:  Incheon International Airport," Airport World, summer 2006
 "Airport Architecture Taking Flight," International Airport Review, July 2001
 "Humanistic Architecture Yields Economic Benefits," Passenger Terminal World, June 2004
 "Airport Architecture: a Blueprint for Success," Passenger Terminal World, May 2004
 "Los Angeles International Airport: Designing a 21st Century Gateway," Architecture Technique, (Chinese Edition) May 2009
 "Making an Impression: Raleigh-Durham International Airport's new Terminal 2 celebrates the airport's role as a gateway to North Carolina," Airport World, Dec/Jan 2009 (UK)
 "Outside the Box: Contemporary Convention Centres," Urban Land Institute, February 2009
 "Civic Icon," Passenger Terminal World, November 2008 (UK)
 "Los Angeles International Airport Redesign Images Unveiled," Building Design, December 9, 2008 (UK)
 "Fentress Architects, Incheon International Airport, Seoul," l'Arca, May 2008 (Italy)
 "Designed for Passengers: RDU," Passenger Terminal World, November 2007 (UK)
 "Active Service: Theatre of War," Museum Practice magazine, Spring 2007 (UK)

External links
Fentress Architects
Airport Council International
American Institute of Architects (AIA) Colorado
U.S. Green Building Council

1947 births
20th-century American architects
Architects from Colorado
Living people
21st-century American architects
People from Greensboro, North Carolina
Architects from North Carolina